Walter Blount may refer to:
Walter Blount (officer of arms) (1807–1894), officer of arms at the College of Arms in London
Walter Blount (soldier) (died 1403), soldier and supporter of John of Gaunt, Duke of Lancaster
Walter Blount, 1st Baron Mountjoy (c. 1416–1474), English politician
Walter Blount (by 1501–43 or later), MP for Stafford
Walter Blount (died 1561), MP for Worcestershire
Sir Walter Blount, 1st Baronet (1594–1654), MP for Droitwich
Sir Walter Blount, 3rd Baronet (died 1717), of the Blount baronets
Sir Walter Blount, 6th Baronet (died 1785), of the Blount baronets
Sir Walter Blount, 7th Baronet (1768–1803), of the Blount baronets
Sir Walter de Sodington Blount, 9th Baronet (1833–1915), of the Blount baronets
Sir Walter Aston Blount, 10th Baronet (1876–1958), of the Blount baronets
Sir Walter Edward Alpin Blount, 12th Baronet (1917–2004), of the Blount baronets

See also
Blount (surname)